Matthew David Marsden (born 3 March 1973) is an English-American actor, producer, singer and former model. He has appeared in films such as Black Hawk Down, Helen of Troy, Anacondas: The Hunt for the Blood Orchid, Tamara, Resident Evil: Extinction, Rambo, Transformers: Revenge of the Fallen, and Atlas Shrugged.

Early life
Marsden was born on 3 March 1973 at Hallam Hospital in West Bromwich, West Midlands, England. He grew up on the Yew Tree Estate in Walsall. His father abandoned the family when Marsden was a child, and his mother Ann then brought him up and his sister alone. He attended Manor High School in Wednesbury, before leaving to go to Dartmouth High School in Great Barr, Birmingham.

Marsden found work as a model in London, Paris and Milan. He was featured in commercials for products such as Jacobs Coffee, Punica, Vimto and Impulse. He has since commented, "I was at college in London and when you're a struggling student it doesn't take a genius to work out that it's easier to model for a few hours each week and earn thousands of pounds than work in a bar for a pittance. But I hated doing it really." After nearly two years of modelling, he decided to get an agent and find work as an actor.

Career
Marsden's acting break came in 1995 when he joined the cast of the ITV soap opera Emmerdale, playing the upper crust Daniel Weir, lover of Linda Glover. He remained in the role for three months before the character was written out. He went on to play the role of surfer Philip Kennedy in Island – a Jersey-based ITV miniseries. Marsden also dressed in drag when he appeared in the Jeannot Szwarc French film Les Soeurs Soleil (The Sun Sisters).

On 3 March 1997, he joined the cast of Coronation Street as mechanic Chris Collins and he remained with the series until 29 March 1998. The role earned him 1997 National Television Award for Most Popular Newcomer. Following his departure from Coronation Street, Marsden decided on a change of direction and a fleeting career as a pop star followed. He signed a £500,000 record deal with Columbia Records and released his debut single in July 1998 called "The Heart's Lone Desire", which reached number 13 in the UK singles chart. He followed with a second single, a cover of Hall & Oates' "She's Gone", with his label-mates Destiny's Child providing backing-vocals, which reached number 24 in the UK singles chart.

Marsden returned to acting, portraying Paris in the USA networks mini-series Helen of Troy; Army Ranger Dale Sizemore in Ridley Scott's blockbuster film Black Hawk Down. He starred in John Irvin's feature Shiner, Anacondas: The Hunt for the Blood Orchid (the sequel to Anaconda) and Tamara, a supernatural thriller by Final Destination screenwriter Jeffrey Reddick. He made appearances in the films DOA: Dead or Alive and Resident Evil: Extinction. He co-starred in Rambo (2008) and Transformers: Revenge of the Fallen.

Personal life
Marsden is married to Nadine Micallef.

Marsden is a practising Roman Catholic. He appeared in Rosary Stars Praying the Gospel (2009). He and his family are frequently involved in activities with Family Theater Productions, a division of Holy Cross Family Ministries, founded by Father Patrick Peyton.

Marsden is an active supporter of the armed forces and has parachuted with the United States Army Parachute Team. He received the title of Kentucky Colonel, the highest award that is bestowed on individuals by the state of Kentucky, in recognition of his support of the U.S. military.

Marsden is a fan of the football club West Bromwich Albion.

In 2020, Marsden announced that he had become an American citizen.

Filmography

Film

Television

Discography

Albums

Singles

References

External links
 
 

1973 births
20th-century English male actors
20th-century English singers
20th-century British male singers
21st-century English male actors
21st-century American male actors
Actors from Staffordshire
American male film actors
American male television actors
American Roman Catholics
English emigrants to the United States
English male film actors
English male singers
English male soap opera actors
English Roman Catholics
English male taekwondo practitioners
Living people
Naturalized citizens of the United States
People from West Bromwich